"Question of Faith" is a song by the Lighthouse Family, released as their fourth single, from their second album Postcards from Heaven (1999). The song was produced by Mike Peden. It was released in November 1998 and reached just outside the top 20 in the UK as well as being just outside the top 70 in Europe and also in the top 90 in the Netherlands.

Tracklisting
 UK CD1
 "Question of Faith" (7" Mix) — 3:52
 "Question of Faith" (Idjut Boys Mix Edit) — 7:27
 "Question of Faith" (Disco Central Mix) — 8:58

 UK CD2
 "Question of Faith" (7" Mix) — 3:52
 "Question of Faith" (Itaal Shur's Main Mix) — 4:23
 "Question of Faith" (Phil "The Kick Drum" Dane & Matt Smith's Under Pressure Vocal Mix) — 8:33

 UK Cassette
 "Question of Faith" (7" Mix) — 3:52
 "Question of Faith" (Idjut Boys Mix Edit) — 7:27

 European CD
 "Question of Faith" (7" Mix) — 3:51
 "Question of Faith" (Tee's Radio Edit) — 3:30
 "Question of Faith" (Tee's Freeze Mix) — 6:20
 "High" (Acoustic Live at the Royal Albert Hall) — 4:08

Charts

Chart performance

"Question of Faith" reached to #21 in the UK Singles Chart and stayed in the charts for 5 weeks. It also reached to #71 in the Eurochart Hot 100 and #83 in the Netherlands and stayed in the charts for 2 and 6 weeks respectively.

References

External links
Chart Stats - UK chart performance of Lighthouse Family's "Question of Faith"
Eurochart Hot 100 which shows the peak position of Lighthouse Family's "Question of Faith"
Dutch chart performance of Lighthouse Family's "Question of Faith".

1998 singles
Lighthouse Family songs
Songs written by Paul Tucker (musician)